"Joah" is a song by Korean-American recording artist Jay Park, released on April 10, 2013, worldwide on iTunes and domestically in Korea as a three-track digital single of the same name. The other songs on the single are "1 Hunnit", and "Welcome". The lyrics are written by Park, and the song was produced by fellow Art of Movement member, Cha Cha Malone. In Korean, "Joah" translates literally to "like" (Revised Romanization: Joha), or in context of the song, "I like you".

Background and composition

Park was inspired to write the song by the change of season in Korea from winter to spring, with the weather getting warmer and warmer. He wanted to make a feel good, old-school song, with inclusion of a brass band, and was influenced by The Jackson 5. The live band of Saturday Night Live Korea, Common Ground, provided the in-session instrumentals.

The music video depicts various locations filmed around Seattle, with the album artwork featuring the iconic Pike Place Market. Park's outfits include a green jacket and hat bearing the logo of the Seattle SuperSonics.

Track listing

Credits
 Jay Park - songwriting, vocals, production
 Cha Cha Malone – producer
 Common Ground – in-session band

Release history

References

External links
 Official Website
  at SidusHQ 
 

2013 songs
2013 singles
Jay Park songs